Serpulidicolidae is a family of crustaceans belonging to the order Cyclopoida.

Genera:
 Abyssotaurus Brenke, Fanenbruck & George, 2018
 Parangium Humes, 1985
 Rhabdopus Southward, 1964
 Rhynchopus Stock, 1979
 Serpulidicola Southward, 1964
 Serpulidicoloides Boxshall & Halsey, 2004

References

Cyclopoida